The UCCU Crosstown Clash is a collegiate sports rivalry between Brigham Young University (BYU) and Utah Valley University (UVU) sponsored by Utah Community Credit Union (UCCU). The two universities are both situated on University Parkway in Orem and Provo, Utah and are located only 3.4 miles apart. While UVU is currently a member of the Western Athletic Conference (WAC), and BYU was in the past a member of the WAC, the series has always been a non-conference game. This is because UVU joined the WAC in 2013 and BYU left the WAC for the Mountain West Conference in 1999.

Men's basketball 
The first rivalry matchup occurred in the first year that UVU transitioned to Division I with BYU winning the inaugural game by almost 20 points. UVU's first win in the series came in 2016 in the Marriott Center with UVU scoring well over 100 points. After UVU got their first home win in the rivalry in 2021, UVU followed the win with a second consecutive victory over BYU in the Marriott Center in 2022 by 15 points. Below is a complete list of series results for the men's basketball rivalry according the BYU athletic department.

Other sports 
BYU holds the advantage in all other sports rivalry series games with UVU. BYU has won each matchup in women's basketball and women's volleyball and holds a sizeable advantage in baseball, women's soccer, and women's volleyball. UVU women's soccer earned their first victory against BYU in 2022 with a 4–2 victory. Later in the year, the two teams met in the 2022 NCAA Division I women's soccer tournament with BYU winning 3–0. The following table summarizes the other sports rivalry series matchups as of January 2023.

See also

References 

College basketball rivalries in the United States
BYU Cougars men's basketball
BYU Cougars women's basketball
Utah Valley Wolverines men's basketball
Utah Valley Wolverines women's basketball